The Cedar Creek Bridge near Haynes, North Dakota is a Pratt through truss structure that was built in 1908.  It was listed on the National Register of Historic Places (NRHP) in 1997.

It is a rigid-connected (riveted) Pratt through truss. It was one of many North Dakota bridges listed on the National Register as part of a Multiple Property Submission. It brings a county section road across Cedar Creek, a tributary to the Cannonball River.

According to its NRHP nomination, "The bridge is significant ... for its association with an important pattern of bridge construction in a number of counties in the state, in which one or two bridge companies received most of the contracts over a successive period of years, even with, or under the pretense of, competitive bidding. This pattern emerged in the late nineteenth century and, in some counties, continued into the 1930s. This bridge serves as a representative example of the pattern; it is one of the two oldest documented bridges in Adams County constructed by a long-term county bridge builder, the Twin City Bridge Company."

References

Road bridges on the National Register of Historic Places in North Dakota
Bridges completed in 1908
National Register of Historic Places in Adams County, North Dakota
1908 establishments in North Dakota
Pratt truss bridges in the United States